The Ministry of European Union Affairs (Turkish: Avrupa Birliği Bakanlığı ) was a ministry of the Turkish government responsible for the accession process between the Republic of Turkey and the European Union. Formed on June 29, 2011 after Prime Minister Recep Tayyip Erdoğan won a third term in the 2011 general election. The Ministry was responsible for co-ordinating negotiations and accession projects throughout the 81 Provinces of Turkey in order to develop relations between Turkey and the European Union. The minister responsible concurrently served as the chief negotiator during the accession process. The Minister concurrently served as the chief negotiator during accession talks with the EU.

History
The ministry was established after the governing Justice and Development Party won a third term in the general election of 2011, in time for the 61st government of Turkey.  Previously, European Union negotiations were handled by the Minister of Foreign Affairs.

The ministry has been headed by six ministers in the past, namely Egemen Bağış (2011–2013), Mevlüt Çavuşoğlu (2013–2014), Volkan Bozkır (2014-August 2015 and again from November 2015 – 2016), Ali Haydar Konca (August–September 2015), Beril Dedeoğlu (September–November 2015) and Ömer Çelik, in office from 24 May 2016 onwards.

Following the declaration of the new government after the presidential election in 2018, the ministry was dissolved, and it was replaced by the Directorate for EU Affairs, a sub-unit of the Ministry of Foreign Affairs.

Organisation
The Ministry of European Union Affairs operated the following 16 directorates in 2015:

List of Ministers of European Union Affairs
Between 2011 and 2018, six Ministers were responsible for this department.

References

Ministries established in 2011
2011 establishments in Turkey
Turkey–European Union relations
European Union
Turkish ministerial offices
Ministers of European Union Affairs of Turkey